Plerogyridae is a family of cnidarians belonging to the order Scleractinia.

Genera:
 Blastomussa Wells, 1968 
 Nemenzophyllia Hodgson & Ross, 1982 
 Physogyra Quelch, 1884 
 Plerogyra Milne Edwards & Haime, 1848

References

Cnidarians